The 1959–60 Hong Kong First Division League season was the 49th since its establishment.

League table

References
1959–60 Hong Kong First Division table (RSSSF)

Hong Kong First Division League seasons
Hong
football